Marie Victoire Lebour (20 August 1876 – 2 October 1971) was a British marine biologist known for her study of the life cycles of various marine animals. She published more than 175 works during her long career.

Early life and education 
Marie Lebour was born the youngest of three daughters to Emily and George Lebour in Woodburn, Northumberland on 20 August 1876. Her father was a professor of geology and Marie regularly joined him on expeditions, collecting specimens for her own collections. She attended Armstrong College and studied art, then went on to Durham University, where she earned degrees in zoology: an associate degree in 1903, bachelor's degree in 1904, master's degree in 1907, and doctorate in 1917.

Career and research 
In 1900, before beginning her scientific education, Lebour began her research career with a paper on land and freshwater molluscs in Northumberland. While studying for her master's degree, Lebour was on staff at Durham University. From 1906–1909, she was a demonstrator in the Department of Zoology at the University of Leeds and from 1909–1915 she was also an assistant lecturer. Lebour's professional research career was entirely conducted at the Marine Biological Association's Laboratory at Plymouth, where she joined the research staff in 1915. She was a full staff member there until 1946, then an honorary staff member until she could no longer conduct research due to health problems, in 1964.

Her main research interests were the larval stages of both trematodes (some species of which are parasites of molluscs) and of molluscs themselves. She published more than 100 papers on these topics during her career. She also worked on microplankton and discovered at least 28 new species which she catalogued in two books. After publishing these books, Lebour used the newly invented plunger jar to better study the egg and larval stages of krill in the North Atlantic, Antarctica, and Bermuda. She also published well-regarded work on the eggs and larvae of sprat, herring, and pilchards. She also conducted research in West Africa. 

Lebour retired in 1945 at the age of 70, but continued to work into the laboratory and publish until she was 88 and her failing vision prevented her from working at the microscope.

Lebour died on 2 October 1971, at the age of 95. Many of Lebour's publications are still used by researchers.

Selected publications

Honors and legacy 
Lebour was a member of several professional societies. She was a fellow of the Linnaean Society, a lifetime fellow of the Zoological Society, and a member of the Marine Biological Association of the United Kingdom. Multiple species of dinoflagellates were named after her, including genera Lebouraia and Lebouridinium and the species Polykrikos lebourae and Cochlodinium lebourae. She was remembered fondly by her colleagues.

References

1876 births
1971 deaths
Women marine biologists
British marine biologists
British women scientists
Fellows of the Linnean Society of London
Scientists from Northumberland
English non-fiction writers
English women writers
Academics of the University of Leeds
Alumni of Armstrong College, Durham